The Woolwich foot tunnel crosses under the River Thames in Woolwich, in East London from Old Woolwich in the Royal Borough of Greenwich to North Woolwich in the London Borough of Newham. The tunnel offers pedestrians and cyclists an alternative way to cross the river when the Woolwich Free Ferry service is not operating. The south entrance is somewhat hidden behind the Waterfront leisure centre. It is the oldest remaining building in the riverside area of Old Woolwich.

Construction

The tunnel was designed by Sir Maurice Fitzmaurice and built by Walter Scott & Middleton for London County Council and opened by Lord Cheylesmore, Chairman of the LCC, on Saturday, 26 October 1912. Its creation owed much to the efforts of working-class politician Will Crooks who had worked in the docks and, after chairing the LCC's Bridges Committee responsible for the tunnel, would later serve as Labour MP for Woolwich.

Refurbishment

Greenwich Council started work to upgrade both this tunnel and the Greenwich foot tunnel on 19 April 2010. The works were to reduce leakage, improve drainage and to install new lifts, CCTV, communication facilities and signage, with an original completion date of March 2011. During the works, the tunnel closed on Monday to Friday daytimes, when the Woolwich Free Ferry was available as an alternative crossing.

On 24 September 2010, Greenwich Council closed the Woolwich foot tunnel to all users, due to structural weaknesses discovered in the stairways and tunnel itself. The tunnel was originally expected to reopen in August 2011, but eventually reopened to the public in December 2011, though initially access to the tunnel was only by stairs until final works on the lifts were completed. 

The tunnel has been fitted with a leaky feeder system to permit operation of mobile phones.

The ‘Friends of Greenwich and Woolwich Foot Tunnels’ (FOGWOFT) was established in September 2013.

In 2016 the Ethos Active Mobility system was installed in the tunnel to monitor and actively manage tunnel usage. The system uses computer vision to count and measure the speed of bicycles and pedestrians, and displays messages on electronic signs to encourage considerate behaviour. The system has also been installed in the Greenwich foot tunnel and aims to make urban shared spaces safer and more pleasant to use for all. The system displays two messages - "No cycling allowed" (in red text) during busy periods, and "Please consider pedestrians" (in green text) during quiet periods.

Usage
A 2016 survey showed that around 1,000 people use the tunnel each day.

See also
 Crossings of the River Thames
 Tunnels underneath the River Thames

References

External links

Greenwich Council foot tunnels page
PortCities Info
Friends of Greenwich & Woolwich Foot Tunnels
Press report of 1912

Pedestrian tunnels in the United Kingdom
Tunnels underneath the River Thames
Grade II listed tunnels
Tunnels completed in 1912
1912 establishments in England
Woolwich
Buildings and structures in the London Borough of Newham
Buildings and structures in the Royal Borough of Greenwich
Grade II listed buildings in the Royal Borough of Greenwich
Tourist attractions in the Royal Borough of Greenwich
Tourist attractions in the London Borough of Newham
Transport in the London Borough of Newham
Transport in the Royal Borough of Greenwich
Footpaths in London